Nasonov's gland produces a pheromone used in recruitment in worker honeybees. The pheromone can serve the purposes of attracting workers to a settled swarm and draw bees who have lost their way back to the hive. It is used to recruit workers to food that lacks a characteristic scent and lead bees to water sources. The gland is located on the dorsal side of the abdomen. Its opening is located at the base of the last tergite at the tip of the abdomen.

The gland was first described in 1882 by the Russian zoologist  Nikolai Viktorovich Nasonov (February 14, 1855 – February 11, 1939).  Nasonov thought that the gland performed perspiration; it was Frederick William Lambert Sladen (May 30, 1876 - 1921) of England who in 1901 first proposed that the gland produced a pheromone.

See also
Nasonov pheromone

References

 Allaby, Michael. The Concise Oxford Dictionary of Zoology. 305. Oxford University Press. New York. 1992.
 Greenfield, Michael D. Signalers and receivers : mechanisms and evolution of arthropod communication. 107. Oxford University Press. 2002. Online. June 9, 2008. Google books.  
 Meyer, John R.  Social Bees. Department of Entomology NC State University. January 31, 2006. Online. June 9, 2008.

Bees
Insect anatomy
Arthropod glands
Chemical ecology